Anthropological Quarterly is a widely read peer-reviewed journal covering topics in social and cultural anthropology. It is housed at the George Washington University Institute for Ethnographic Research.

Anthropological Quarterly was founded in 1921 by John Montgomery Cooper of The Catholic University of America and was published by The Catholic University of America Press from 1921 to 1953 under the name Primitive Man. Since 2001, the journal has been published by the George Washington University Institute for Ethnographic Research.

The journal publishes articles, social thought and commentary essays on timely political and social issues, book reviews, and book review essays.

 the journal is edited by Roy Richard Grinker.

References

Anthropology journals
Publications established in 1921
George Washington University
Quarterly journals
English-language journals
Catholic University of America academic journals